Michael Francis Troy (October 3, 1940 – August 3, 2019) was an American competitive swimmer, a two-time Olympic champion, and world record-holder in three events.

The peak of Troy's swimming career occurred between 1959 and 1960 while he was coached by Doc Counsilman of the Indiana Hoosiers swimming and diving team at Indiana University.  At the 1960 Summer Olympics in Rome, he won his first gold medal as a member of the winning U.S. team in the men's 4×200-meter freestyle relay.  Individually, he won a second gold with his first-place finish in the men's 200-meter butterfly—his signature event.

Troy broke the world record in the 200-meter butterfly six consecutive times before it was taken over by fellow American swimmer Carl Robie in 1961. In 1971 he was inducted into the International Swimming Hall of Fame.

After college, Troy entered active duty with the United States Navy on February 15, 1964 and completed Officer Candidate School. Troy was commissioned as an Ensign and volunteered for Underwater Demolition Training, now known as Basic Underwater Demolition/SEAL (BUD/S) training. After months of grueling training, Troy graduated with BUD/S class 33 in December 1964. Troy received assignment to Underwater Demolition Team ELEVEN (UDT-11) and later deployed with his team to South Vietnam in 1966.  He was recommended for the numerous awards for his combat service during the Vietnam War. Troy resigned from active duty on February 28, 1969. After leaving military service Troy settled in the San Diego area where he worked as a real estate agent and swimming coach. His trainees included Mike Stamm. At the time of his death in 2019 Troy was co-owner of the Gold Medal Swim School in Chandler, Arizona, with two time Olympic coach Mike Walker. Troy served as Chairman of the International Section of the Olympic Committee and Vice President of the American Swimming Coaches Association. Troy was the National Director of the USA Paralympic Swimming Team. He accompanied the team to Athens, Greece in September 2004 where the U.S. Paralympic team won numerous medals.

Troy died on August 3, 2019 in Arizona at the age of 78.

See also
 List of members of the International Swimming Hall of Fame
 List of Indiana University (Bloomington) people
 List of Olympic medalists in swimming (men)
 World record progression 200 metres butterfly
 World record progression 4 × 100 metres medley relay
 World record progression 4 × 200 metres freestyle relay

References

External links

 "Glory Of Old IU / 100 years of Indiana Athletics" by Bob Hammel and Kit Klingelhoffer

1940 births
2019 deaths
American male butterfly swimmers
American male freestyle swimmers
United States Navy personnel of the Vietnam War
American swimming coaches
World record setters in swimming
Indiana Hoosiers men's swimmers
Medalists at the 1960 Summer Olympics
Military personnel from Indiana
Olympic gold medalists for the United States in swimming
Pan American Games gold medalists for the United States
Pan American Games medalists in swimming
Swimmers from Indianapolis
Swimmers at the 1959 Pan American Games
Swimmers at the 1960 Summer Olympics
United States Navy SEALs personnel
Medalists at the 1959 Pan American Games